Ben Scott (born November 13, 1942) is a former American politician. He served as a Democratic member for the 58th district in the Kansas House of Representatives from 2015 to 2016.

References

1942 births
Living people
Democratic Party members of the Kansas House of Representatives
21st-century American politicians
People from Topeka, Kansas